Andi Farid Izdihar, also known as Andi Gilang (born 14 August 1997), is a motorcycle racer from Indonesia who currently races in Supersport 600 class of Asia Road Racing Championship (ARRC). He previously participated in Moto3 for Honda Team Asia.

Career

Early career
Izdihar was first introduced to motorcycle racing when he was 8, and started competing in local competitions in Bulukumba Regency at 10. He later joined Astra Honda Racing young riders development program in 2010.

Between 2011–2013, Izdihar took part in Indospeed Race Series, riding a Honda CBR150R. He also participated in Region 2 Motoprix, racing for Honda Daya Golden team.

He was registered as a competitor in the motorcycling at 2016 Pekan Olahraga Nasional, representing West Java. He earned gold in the Underbone A individual, and silver in the Underbone A team.

Asia Talent Cup 
Izdihar made his debut on international career level in 2014 Asia Dream Cup, where he was 6th in the final standings. After that, he was picked to compete in 2015 Asia Talent Cup. He won the race at Losail International Circuit, and finished 2nd at Sepang International Circuit. In total, he scored 104 points and was ranked 9th in the 2015 final standings. He also raced in Suzuka 4 Hours together with Aditya Pangestu as the pair finished 2nd.

In 2016 He stayed racing in Asia Talent Cup. He won the second race at Losail, and first races of round 3 and 6 at Sepang. He competed against Thai rider, Somkiat Chantra, but his DNF results in the final round shattered his hopes of winning the Asia Talent Cup championship, an achievement earned by Somkiat.

CEV Moto3 Junior World Championship
Through Astra Honda Racing Team, he participated in 2016 FIM CEV Moto3 Junior World Championship. His first season racing in Europe was concluded with ranking 32nd in the standings, as he finished in the points once, a 12th place at Portimao Circuit.

He was retained by Astra Honda Racing for 2017 FIM CEV Moto3 Junior World Championship, and he finished 5th at the season opener Circuito de Albacete. In overall, Izdihar made it to 17th in the final standings, scoring 29 points during the year. He also raced in AP250 class of Asia Road Racing Championship (ARRC), as a wildcard for Sentul round. He achieved 2nd and 3rd in the 2 races of the round.

After his place in CEV Moto3 was taken over by Gerry Salim, Izdihar was appointed by Astra Honda Racing to ride Honda CBR600RR in 2018 ARRC, in the Supersport 600 (SS600) class. He scored double victories at Sentul round. The results put him in contention for the championship title as his points were not too far from the leading riders (after Sentul round he ranked 3rd). However, in the last round at Chang International Circuit, he only ranked 7th and 8th, and so finished 5th in the final standings.

He continued to race in 2019 ARRC SS600 class, with Astra Honda Racing, where he was 5th in the final standings, with 2 podium finishes at Sepang International Circuit and at The Bend Motorsport Park, both coming in Race 2 of respective rounds.

Moto2 World Championship
He was picked by Astra Honda Racing team to race in the majority of the 2019 FIM CEV Moto2 European Championship season. He finished in the top 10 three times, collecting 36 points, and finishing the season in 14th place overall.

He participated in the 2019 Misano Moto2 race as a replacement for Dimas Ekky, at Idemitsu Honda Team Asia, who was absent due to an injury, and he finished the race in 24th position.

For the 2020 Moto2 season, he replaced Dimas Ekky permanently, at the Idemitsu Honda Asia Team, where he joined former competitor in Asia Talent Cup Somkiat Chantra. Izdihar did not score any points throughout the season however.

Moto3 World Championship 
Following his poor Moto2 season, Izdihar changed to the 2021 Moto3 World Championship, as he and Ai Ogura switched places at Honda Team Asia between Moto3 and Moto2. Izdihar would come in the points four times throughout the season, scoring a point each in France, Germany, Austria, and Rimini. He finished with 4 points, and was not renewed for 2022, being replaced by fellow Indonesian rider Mario Aji at the Honda Asia Team.

Return to Asia Road Racing 
Izdihar was signed again by Astra Honda Racing to race in Supersport 600 class in 2022, aboard the new CBR600RR design. He took two victories in both first races of Round 1 (Buriram) and 4 (Sepang).

Personal life 
Izdihar was born to couples Andi Suriadi (father) and Andi Rina Soviana (mother). Outside his racing duties, he enjoys billiard, Futsal, and watching movies. Although his full name is Andi Farid Izdihar -which is always registered in all racing series he competes in on national and international levels- he is known better to Indonesian public as Andi Gilang.

He is married to a policewoman since 2020.

Career statistics

Indoprix

Races by year
(key) (Races in bold indicate pole position; races in italics indicate fastest lap)

Asia Talent Cup

Races by year
(key) (Races in bold indicate pole position; races in italics indicate fastest lap)

FIM CEV Moto3 Junior World Championship

Races by year
(key) (Races in bold indicate pole position, races in italics indicate fastest lap)

FIM CEV Moto2 European Championship

Races by year
(key) (Races in bold indicate pole position, races in italics indicate fastest lap)

Grand Prix motorcycle racing

By season

By class

Races by year
(key) (Races in bold indicate pole position; races in italics indicate fastest lap)

ARRC Supersports 600

Races by year
(key) (Races in bold indicate pole position; races in italics indicate fastest lap)

References

External links

1997 births
Living people
People from Sulawesi
People from Bulukumba Regency
People from South Sulawesi
Indonesian Muslims
Bugis people
Indonesian motorcycle racers
Moto2 World Championship riders
Moto3 World Championship riders